Gravity and Other Myths is an acrobatic contemporary circus troupe based in Adelaide, South Australia, founded in 2009.

Characteristics 
Gravity and Other Myths was formed by a group of students participating in the Australian Cirkidz program in 2009.

Unlike many circus acts, Gravity and Other Myths' artists do not hide the intense physical effort of their acts, instead highlighting the effort to comedic effect. During some acts there is a close contact with the audience which sits or stands around the stage, and the atmosphere between acts is informal. The performances include traditional circus skills such as acrobatics, juggling, and clowning, but combine these with elements of dance and theatre. 

The group has appeared at festivals and theatres in Australia, including the Adelaide Festival of the Arts, as well as touring to many countries. It rotates through a changing repertoire of shows.

The group has won several awards, including the Dance Award 2015 for Best Physical Theatre and the Green Room Award 2015 for Outstanding Contemporary Circus. 

In 2021, during the COVID-19 pandemic in Australia, the company had a huge response when it conducted recruitment sessions in Adelaide to increase the number of performers by eight.

Productions and members 
Since their formation in 2009, Gravity and Other Myths has created many individual productions, including: 
 Freefall
 Exhale
 Out of Chaos
 A Simple Space
 Backbone

, their members are: 
 Cast
 Lachlan Binns
 Jascha Boyce
 Joanne Curry
 Lachlan Harper
 Mieke Lizotte
 Jackson Manson
 Jacob Randell
 Lewis Rankin
 Martin Schreiber
 Lewie West

 Crew
 Elliot Zoerner and Shenton Gregory (music)
 Darcy Grant (director)
 Geoff Cobham (designer)
 Craig Harrison (producer)
 Triton Tunis-Mitchell (assistant)

See also
List of circuses and circus owners

References

External links 
 

Australian circuses
Theatre companies in Australia
Performing arts in Adelaide